The 2012–14 European Nations Cup Third Division is the fourth tier of rugby union in Europe behind the Six Nations Championship and the 2012-2014 European Nations Cup First Division and the 2012–14 European Nations Cup Second Division.

This will be the first tournament for Turkey, while returning from the 2010-2012 European Nations Cup Third Division are Slovakia and Azerbaijan.  The winning team will be promoted to Division 2D of the European Nations Cup for the 2014–2016 cup.

This tournament, unlike the 1st and 2nd division tournaments, does not form part of the 2015 Rugby World Cup qualification system.

Division 3A

2012–13
Table

Games

2013–14
Table

Games

2012–2014
Table

See also
 European Nations Cup
 2012-2014 European Nations Cup First Division
 2012–2014 European Nations Cup Second Division

References

2012-14
2012–13 in European rugby union
2013–14 in European rugby union
European Nations Cup Third Division
European Nations Cup Third Division
European Nations Cup Third Division